Nicholas Scott Additon (born December 16, 1987) is a former professional baseball pitcher. He played in the KBO League for the Lotte Giants and the Chinese Professional Baseball League (CPBL) for the Chinatrust Brothers.

Career

St. Louis Cardinals
Prior to playing professionally, he attended Western High School in Davie and then Indian River State College before being drafted by the St. Louis Cardinals in the 47th round of the 2006 Major League Baseball Draft. He began his professional career the next year.

He posted ERAs of 3.41, 2.23 and 3.11 in his first three seasons. Notably, in 2008, he was 9–5 with a 2.50 ERA for the Quad Cities River Bandits and 2–0 with a 0.50 ERA for the Palm Beach Cardinals. He was 9–6 with a 4.43 record for the Springfield Cardinals in 2010 and in 2011, he was 8-9 between Springfield and the Memphis Redbirds. He pitched for the GCL Cardinals and Memphis in 2012 and in 2013, he was 9–7 with a 4.10 ERA for Memphis. On November 4, 2013, Additon elected free agency.

Baltimore Orioles
On November 16, 2013, Additon signed a minor league deal with the Baltimore Orioles. He played 2014 with the AA Bowie Baysox and the AAA Norfolk Tides. Additon became a free agent after the season.

Milwaukee Brewers
On November 25, 2014, Additon signed a minor league deal with the Milwaukee Brewers. He was assigned to the AAA Colorado Springs Sky Sox. The Brewers released Additon on August 2, 2015.

Second Stint with Baltimore Orioles
On August 9, 2015, Additon returned to the Orioles and was assigned to Bowie. Additon played for Norfolk before he was released on August 3, 2016.

Chinatrust Brothers
Additon signed with the Chinatrust Brothers of the Chinese Professional Baseball League shortly after his release from Baltimore. He also began the 2017 season with Chinatrust before being released partway into the season.

Lotte Giants
He joined the Lotte Giants for 2017. At the time of his signing with the Korean club, he had spent part or all of six seasons at Triple-A, going 28–41 with a 4.41 ERA in 559.2 innings.

Colorado Rockies
On August 6, 2017, Additon signed a minor league deal with the Colorado Rockies and was assigned to the AA Hartford Yard Goats. He elected free agency on November 7, 2017.

Second Stint with Chinatrust
On January 17, 2018, Additon signed with the Chinatrust Brothers of the Chinese Professional Baseball League. On June 9, 2018, Additon threw a no-hitter against the Uni-President Lions, becoming the eighth player in the 29-year history of the CPBL to accomplish such a feat. In December 2018, Additon re-signed with the Brothers for the 2019 season. However, following a start on July 9, 2019, in which he injured his shoulder, he was released by the Brothers the next day.

Retirement
Additon retired as an active player following the 2019 season and later was hired as an international scout for the Chinatrust Brothers.

Additon has also spent multiple seasons in the Mexican Pacific Winter League and Dominican Winter League, playing for the Venados de Mazatlan and Leones del Escogido.

Personal life
Additon's older brother Ryan is an umpire in Major League Baseball.

References

External links

CPBL

1987 births
Living people
American expatriate baseball players in South Korea
American expatriate baseball players in Taiwan
Baseball players from Florida
Batavia Muckdogs players
Bowie Baysox players
CTBC Brothers players
Colorado Springs Sky Sox players
Gulf Coast Cardinals players
Hartford Yard Goats players
Johnson City Cardinals players
KBO League pitchers
Leones del Escogido players
American expatriate baseball players in the Dominican Republic
Lotte Giants players
Memphis Redbirds players
Norfolk Tides players
Palm Beach Cardinals players
People from Davie, Florida
Quad Cities River Bandits players
Springfield Cardinals players
Venados de Mazatlán players
American expatriate baseball players in Mexico
Indian River State Pioneers baseball players
Sportspeople from Broward County, Florida